The 2019 FFAS Senior League was the 39th edition of the FFAS Senior League, the top football league of American Samoa organized by the Football Federation American Samoa. This season started on 23 August 2019. Most games took place at the 2,000-capacity Pago Park Soccer Stadium.

Champions

Teams
Eleven teams competed in the league.
 Black Roses
 Green Bay
 Ilaoa and To'omata
 Lion Heart
 Pago Youth
 PanSa
 Royal Puma
 Tafuna Jets
 Taputimu Youth
 Utulei Youth
 Vaiala Tongan

League table
Rest of season cancelled due to measles outbreak and irrelevance.

Results

References

External links

FFAS Senior League seasons
American Samoa
FFAS Senior League